Tim Kneule (born 18 August 1986) is a German handball player for Frisch Auf Göppingen and the German national team.

References

1986 births
Living people
German male handball players
People from Reutlingen
Sportspeople from Tübingen (region)